The following is a list of notable events and releases of the year 2005 in Norwegian music.

Events

January
 27 – The 8th Polarjazz Festival started in Longyearbyen, Svalbard (January 27 – 29).

February
 3 – Kristiansund Opera Festival opened (February 3 – 19).

March
 18
 The 32nd Vossajazz started at Voss, Norway (March 18 – 20).
 Berit Opheim was awarded Vossajazzprisen 2005.
 19 – Jan Gunnar Hoff performs the commissioned work Free flow songs for Vossajazz 2005.

April
 29 –  Bergenfest started in Bergen (April 29 – May 7).

May
 25
The start of Bergen International Music Festival Festspillene i Bergen (May 25 – June 5).
 The 33rd Nattjazz started in Bergen, Norway (May 25 – June 4).

June
 16 – Norwegian Wood started in Oslo, Norway (June 16 – 19).
 23 – The 1st Punktfestivalen started in Kristiansand, Norway (June 23–25).

July
 6 – The 41st Kongsberg Jazzfestival started in Kongsberg, Norway (July 6 – 8).
 18 – The 45th Moldejazz started in Molde, Norway with Arild Andersen as artist in residence (July 18 – 23).

August
 10 – The 19th Sildajazz started in Haugesund, Norway (August 10 – 14).
 15 – The 20th Oslo Jazzfestival started in Oslo, Norway (August 15 – 21).

September
 15 – DølaJazz started in Lillehammer, Norway (September 15 – 18).
 30 – Ultima Oslo Contemporary Music Festival started in Oslo, Norway (September 30 – Oktober 16).

Oktober
 20 – The 3rd Ekkofestival started in Bergen (Oktober 20 – 23).
 24 – The 4th Insomnia Festival started in Tromsø (October 24 – 27).

November
 1 – The Oslo World Music Festival started in Oslo (November 1 – 6).

December
 17 – The Hammerslagfestivalen Vinterblot started in Spiret, Tønsberg.

Unknown date
 The Rock band Accidents Never Happen was formed.

Albums released

April

Unknown date

J
 Tore Johansen
 Like That (Gemini Records), featuring Karin Krog
 Per Jørgensen
 Unspoken Songs (Gemini Records), with Tobias Sjögren

S
 Karl Seglem
 Dikt (NorCD), with poems by Jon Fosse
 Reik (Ozella Records)

Deaths

January
 7 – Ivar Medaas, folk singer (born 1938).

June
 29 – Mikkel Flagstad, jazz saxophonist (born 1930).

August
 17 – Lars Kristian Brynildsen, clarinetist, Bergen Philharmonic Orchestra (born 1954).

October
 9 – Jan Rohde, rock singer (born 1942).

November
 10 – Vidar Sandbeck, folk singer and author (born 1918).

See also
 2005 in Norway
 Music of Norway
 Norway in the Eurovision Song Contest 2005
 2005 in Swiss music

References

 
Norwegian music
Norwegian
Music
2000s in Norwegian music